The 2011 UC Davis football team represented the University of California, Davis as a member of the Great West Conference (GWC) during the 2011 NCAA Division I FCS football season. Led by 19th-year head coach Bob Biggs, UC Davis compiled an overall record of 4–7 with a mark of 1–3 in conference play, tying for fourth place in the GWC. The Aggies played home games at Aggie Stadium in Davis, California.

This was UC Davis' final year as a member of the GWC as they became a member of the Big Sky Conference in 2012.

Schedule

References

UC Davis
UC Davis Aggies football seasons
UC Davis Aggies football